FC Slavyansky Slavyansk-na-Kubani was a Russian football team from Slavyansk-na-Kubani. It played professionally in the Russian Second Division in 2011–12 and 2012–13 seasons and then was dissolved due to lack of financing.

External links
  Official site

Association football clubs established in 2010
Association football clubs disestablished in 2013
Defunct football clubs in Russia
Sport in Krasnodar Krai
2010 establishments in Russia